David A. Wardle  (born 1963) is a Swedish-New Zealand ecologist. He is currently working as the Smithsonian Professor of Forest Ecology at Nanyang Technological University, Singapore. After obtaining a Bachelor of Science degree at the University of Canterbury he completed a Doctor of Philosophy degree under Dennis Parkinson at the University of Calgary in 1989, and then worked in New Zealand at Landcare Research before moving to the Swedish University of Agricultural Sciences in Umeå. Wardle is a Fellow of the Royal Society of New Zealand.

In 1999 he was awarded the New Zealand Association of Scientists Research Medal for his ecological work on the associations between above-ground and below-ground communities. He was the recipient of the Te Tohu Taiao – Award for Ecological Excellence from New Zealand Ecological Society in 2001, awarded annually to a New Zealand scientist on the basis of research and application in ecology. In 2010 he became a Wallenberg Scholar.

Selected works
 Communities and Ecosystems: Linking the Aboveground and Belowground Components David A. Wardle, Princeton University Press, 2002. 
 Aboveground–Belowground Linkages: Biotic Interactions, Ecosystem Processes, and Global Change David A. Wardle and Richard D. Bardgett, Oxford University Press, 2010.

References

External links
 google scholar 
 Swedish institutional homepage
 Landcare institutional homepage

Living people
New Zealand academics
Academic staff of the Swedish University of Agricultural Sciences
Swedish biologists
New Zealand ecologists
University of Canterbury alumni
University of Calgary alumni
1963 births
Academic staff of Nanyang Technological University